The following is a discography of production by Warren G.

1993

MC Breed - The New Breed 
 03. "Gotta Get Mine" (feat. 2Pac) (Produced with Colin Wolfe)

Various Artists - Poetic Justice (soundtrack) 
 02. "Indo Smoke" (Mista Grimm feat. Warren G & Nate Dogg)
 08. "Definition of a Thug Nigga" (2Pac) (Produced with 2Pac)

1994

Various Artists - Above the Rim (soundtrack) 
 07. "Regulate" (Warren G feat. Nate Dogg)
 Sample Credit: "I Keep Forgettin' (Every Time You're Near)" by Michael McDonald
 Sample Credit: "Sign of the Times" by Bob James

DFC - Things in tha Hood 
 06. "Pass the Hooter" (feat. Warren G)

Warren G - Regulate... G Funk Era 
 01. "Regulate" (feat. Nate Dogg)
 Sample Credit: "I Keep Forgettin' (Every Time You're Near)" by Michael McDonald
 Sample Credit: "Sign of the Times" by Bob James
 02. "Do You See"
 Sample Credit: "Juicy Fruit" by Mtume
 Sample Credit: "Mama Used To Say" by Junior Giscombe
 03. "Gangsta Sermon" (feat. B-Tip and Ricky Harris)
 04. "Recognize" (feat. Twinz)
 05. "Super Soul Sis" (feat. Jah Skills)
 Sample Credit: "Don't Stop (Ever Loving Me)" by One Way
 Sample Credit: "Why Have I Lost You" by Cameo
 Sample Credit: "Nuthin' but a 'G' Thang (Freestyle Remix)" by Snoop Dogg
 06. "94' Ho Draft" (feat. B-Tip and Ricky Harris)
 Sample Credit: "Groove to Get Down" by T-Connection
 07. "So Many Ways" (feat. Wayniac and Lady Levi)
 08. "This D.J."
 Sample Credit: "Curious" by Midnight Star
 Sample Credit: "Juicy Fruit" by Mtume
 Sample Credit: "Paid in Full" by Eric B. & Rakim
 09. "This Is the Shack" (feat. The Dove Shack)
 10. "What's Next" (feat. Mr. Malik)
 11. "And Ya Don't Stop"
 Sample Credit: "Janitzio" by Don Julian 
 12. "Runnin' wit No Breaks" (feat. Jah Skills, Bo Roc, G Child and The Twinz)
 Sample Credit: "Go On and Cry" by Les McCann & Eddie Harris
 Sample Credit: "N.T." by Kool & the Gang

Thug Life - Thug Life: Volume 1 
 06. "How Long Will They Mourn Me?" (feat. Nate Dogg) (Produced with Nate Dogg)

Shaquille O'Neal - Shaq Fu: Da Return 
 03. "Biological Didn't Bother (G-Funk Version)"
 04. "My Dear" (feat. Warren G)

Slick Rick - Behind Bars
 11. "Behind Bars (Dum Ditty Dum Mix)" (feat. Warren G)

Various Artists - B-Ball's Best Kept Secret 
 06. "Flow On" (Cedric Ceballos & Warren G)

Various Artists - Jason's Lyric (soundtrack) 
 09. "Walk Away" (Da 5 Footaz)
 14. "First Round Draft Pick" (Twinz feat. Warren G)

1995

Kam - Made In America 
 11. "Keep Tha Peace" (Produced with Kam)

Various Artists - Bad Boys (soundtrack) 
 02. "So Many Ways (Bad Boys Version)" (Warren G)

Various Artists - The Show (soundtrack) 
 20. "Still Can't Fade It" (Warren G feat. Twinz & Bo-Roc)

The Dove Shack - This Is the Shack 
 03. "This Is the Shack"

Twinz - Conversation 
 01. "Conversation # 1"
 02. "Round & Round" (feat. Nancy Fletcher)
 03. "Good Times" (feat. Nancy Fletcher)
 05. "Jump Ta This"
 06. "Eastside LB" (feat. Warren G & Nancy Fletcher)
 07. "Sorry I Kept You" (feat. Warren G & Nancy Fletcher)
 08. "Conversation # 2"
 09. "Journey Wit Me" (feat. Bo-Roc)
 10. "Hollywood" (feat. Neb, Jah-Skillz and Nanci Fletcher)
 11. "1st Round Draft Pick" (feat. Warren G)
 12. "Conversation # 3"
 13. "Don't Get It Twisted" (feat. New Birth)
 14. "Pass It On" (feat. Foesum & Warren G)

1996

Various Artists - The Nutty Professor (soundtrack) 
 08. "We Want Yo Hands Up" (Warren G feat. Mr. Malik)

Various Artists - Supercop (soundtrack) 
 02. "What's Love Got to Do with It" (Warren G feat. Adina Howard)
 Sample Credit: "What's Love Got to Do with It" by Tina Turner

Yo-Yo - Total Control 
 10. "Yo-Yo's Night"

1997

Warren G - Take a Look Over Your Shoulder 
 01. "Star Trek Intro"
 02. "Annie Mae" (feat. Nate Dogg)
 03. "Smokin' Me Out" (feat. Ron Isley)
 Sample Credit: "Coolin' Me Out" by The Isley Brothers
 04. "Ricky In Church"
 05. "Reality"
 06. "Ricky and G-Child"
 07. "Young Fun" (feat. Jayo Felony & Knee-Hi)
 08. "What We Go Through" (feat. Mr. Malik, Bad Azz & Perfec)
 09. "We Brings Heat" (feat. Twinz & Da Five Footaz)
 10. "Transformers"
 11. "Real Tight Intro"
 12. "Relax Ya Mind" (feat. Reel Tight)
 13. "To All DJ's"
 14. "Back Up"
 15. "Can You Feel It"
 Sample Credit: "Can You Feel It" by The Fat Boys
 16. "I Shot the Sheriff"
 Sample Credit: "I Shot the Sheriff" by Bob Marley
 17. "I Shot the Sheriff (EPMD Remix)"

2Pac - R U Still Down? (Remember Me) (Disc 1) 
 10. "Lie To Kick It"  (feat. Richie Rich)
 13. "Definition of a Thug Nigga"

1998

Various Artists - Woo (soundtrack) 
 04. "Nobody Does It Better" (Nate Dogg feat. Warren G)
 Sample Credit: "Let's Get Closer" by Atlantic Starr

Nate Dogg - G-Funk Classics, Vol. 1 & 2 (Disc 2: The Prodigal Son) 
 07. "No Matter Where I Go" (feat. Barbara Wilson)
 09. "Friends" (feat. Snoop Dogg & Warren G)
 12. "Nobody Does It Better" (feat. Warren G)
 Sample Credit: "Let's Get Closer" by Atlantic Starr

Kurupt - Kuruption! 
 10. "That's Gangsta"

2Pac - Greatest Hits (Disc 2) 
 08. "How Long Will They Mourn Me?"  (with Thug Life feat. Nate Dogg) (Produced with Nate Dogg)

Redman - I'll Bee Dat! 
 03. "Pick It Up (Warren G Remix)"

1999

Reel Tight - Back to the Real 
 03. "I Lied"
 04. "I'm So Sorry" (feat. Jessica)
 08. "Lady"
 09. "Sittin' In the Club" (feat. Ronnie DeVoe)

Mac Dre - Rapper Gone Bad 
 04. "Fast Money" (feat. Warren G, Kokane & Dutches)

Warren G - I Want It All 
 01. "Intro"
 02. "Gangsta Love" (feat. Kurupt, RBX & Nate Dogg)
 03. "Why oh Why" (feat. Daz Dillinger & Kurupt)
 04. "Dollars Make Sence" (feat. Kurupt & Crucial Conflict)
 Sample Credit: "Painted Pictures" by Commodores
 05. "I Want It All" (feat. Mack 10)
 Sample Credit: "I Like It" by DeBarge
 06. "Havin' Thangs" (feat. Jermaine Dupri)
 07. "You Never Know" (feat. Snoop Dogg, Phats Bossi & Reel Tight)
 Sample Credit: "Sweet Love" by Lionel Richie
 09. "G-Spot" (feat. El DeBarge & Val Young)
 Sample Credit: "Valdez In The Country" by D. Hathaway
 11. "Dope Beat"
 Sample Credit: "Private World" by Side Effect
 12. "World Wide Ryders" (feat. Neb Love and K-Bar)
 13. "Game Don't Wait" (feat. Snoop Dogg, Nate Dogg & Xzibit)
 14. "If We Give You a Chance" (feat. Slick Rick, Phats Bossi & Val Young)
 15. "I Want It All (Remix)" (feat. Memphis Bleek, Drag-On & Tikki Diamond)
 16. "Outro"

2000

Tha Eastsidaz - Tha Eastsidaz 
 14. "Big Bang Theory" (feat. Xzibit, Kurupt, CPO & Pinky)

TQ - The Second Coming 
 10. "One Day" (feat. Layzie Bone)
 14. "The Grind" (feat. Warren G)

Various Artists - Big Momma's House (soundtrack) 
 06. "Radio" (Kurupt feat. Phats Bossi)

2001

Various Artists - Uninvited Guests (soundtrack) 
 03. "Through The Rain" (Phats Bossi) (Produced with Dr. Dre)

Various Artists - Bones (soundtrack) 
 11. "If You Came Here to Party" (Snoop Dogg feat. Tha Eastsidaz & Kola)

Daz Dillinger - Who Ride wit Us: Tha Compalation, Vol. 1 
 20. "Why oh Why" (feat. Warren G & Kurupt)

Warren G - The Return of the Regulator 
 01. "Intro"
 03. "Here Comes Another Hit" (feat. Mista Grimm & Nate Dogg)
 05. "This Gangsta Shit Is Too Much" (feat. Butch Cassidy)
 06. "Pump Up (Skit)"
 07. "Young Locs Slow Down" (feat. WC & Butch Cassidy)
 08. "Speed Dreamin'" (feat. George Clinton & Mista Grimm)
 09. "Yo' Sassy Ways" (feat. Snoop Dogg & Nate Dogg)
 10. "Deez Nuts Part II (Skit)"
 11. "It Ain't Nothin' Wrong With You" (feat. Mista Grimm, Boss Hogg & Vic Damone)
 12. "Ghetto Village"
 13. "They Lovin' Me Now" (feat. Boss Hogg & Butch Cassidy)
 14. "Streets of LBC" (feat. Lady Mo)
 15. "G-Funk Is Here To Stay" (feat. Mista Grimm & Kokane)
 16. "Keepin' It Strong" (feat. El DeBarge)

2003

Various Artists - True Crime: Streets of LA (soundtrack) 
 04. "What U Wanna Do" (Warren G feat. RBX)

2004

Knoc-turn'al - The Way I Am 
 10. "What We Do" (feat. Xzibit, Warren G & Nate Dogg)

Various Artists - West Coast Unified 
 12. "Turn It Up Now" (Warren G feat. Chuck Taylor)
 25. "After Dark" (Snoop Dogg feat. Warren G, Bad Azz, Kokane, Daz Dillinger & E-White)

2005

Various Artists - XXx: State of the Union (soundtrack) 
 11. "Lookin' For U" (Chingy feat. G.I.B.)

Warren G - In the Mid-Nite Hour 
 01. "Intro Shhhh"
 02. "On My Mind" (feat. Bishop Lamont, Chevy Jones, Mike Anthony & Bokey)
 03. "Make It Do What It Do" (feat. Bishop Lamont)
 04. "In Case Some Shit Go Down" (feat. Mike Jones & Frank Lee White)
 05. "I Need a Light" (feat. Nate Dogg)
 06. "Get U Down'" (feat. B-Real & Side Effect)
 07. "A Chronic Break"
 08. "Weed Song" (feat. Frank Lee White)
 09. "Wheels Keep Spinin'"
 11. "Walk These Streets" (feat. Raphael Saadiq) (Produced with Raphael Saadiq)
 12. "Garilla Pimpin" (feat. Bishop Lamont)
 13. "Turn It Up Loud" (feat. Chuck Taylor)
 14. "In The Mid-Nite Hour"
 15. "I Like That There" (feat. Bishop Lamont)
 16. "Yes Sir" (feat. Snoop Dogg, Bishop Lamont & Frank Lee White)
 17. "Ahh" (feat. Bishop Lamont, Frank Lee White and Chuck Taylor)
 18. "All I Ask of You" (feat. Frank Lee White, Bishop Lamont and Chevy Jones)
 19. "Get U Down, Part II" (feat. B-Real, Snoop Dogg, Ice Cube & Side Effect)

2006

Ice Cube - Laugh Now, Cry Later 
 22. "Race Card" (Best Buy Bonus Track)

2009

Ray J - For the Love of Ray J 
 03. "Crush" (feat. Warren G)

Gucci Mane 
 00. "Crush on You"

Wale & 9th Wonder - Back to the Feature 
 20. "Rhyme and Reason" (feat. Tre)

Warren G - The G Files 
 01. "Intro"
 02. "The West Is Back" (feat. Bad Lucc & Halla)
 03. "True Star" (feat. BJ)
 04. "Let's Get High (420 Anthem)" (feat. Travis Barker & Black Nicc)
 05. "100 Miles and Runnin" (feat. Raekwon & Nate Dogg)
 06. "Skate, Skate" (feat. Halla)
 07. "Drinks Ain't Free"
 08. "Swagger Rich" (feat. Snoop Dogg & Cassie Davis)
 09. "Suicide" (feat. RBX)
 10. "Masquerade" (feat. Bad Lucc & Halla)
 11. "Hold On"
 12. "What's Wrong" (feat. Black Nicc & Halla)
 13. "Ringtone"
 14. "Crush" (feat. Ray J)

2011

Styles P - Master of Ceremonies 
 01. "How I Fly" (featured Avery Storm)

Snoop Dogg & Wiz Khalifa - Mac & Devin Go to High School (soundtrack) 
 02. "I Get Lifted" (feat. LaToiya Williams)

Young Jeezy - Thug Motivation 103: Hustlerz Ambition 
 05. "Leave You Alone" (feat. Ne-Yo)

2012

E-40 - The Block Brochure: Welcome to the Soil 3 
 13. "What Happened to Them Days" (feat. J Banks)

Young Jeezy - It's Tha World 
 9. "Just Got Word" (feat. YG)

2013

Mistah F.A.B. - I Found My Backpack 3 
 01. "Dreams"

Problem - The Separation 
 12. "Phone"

2015

Rap Monster x Warren G 
 1. "P.D.D"

2016

Bishop Lamont - The Reformation G.D.N.I.A.F.T 
 9. "Razor Blade"

Singles produced 
 1993 
 "Gotta Get Mine" (MC Breed featuring 2Pac)
 "Indo Smoke" (Mista Grimm featuring Warren G & Nate Dogg)
 1994 
 "Regulate" (Warren G featuring Nate Dogg)
 "How Long Will They Mourn Me?" (Thug Life featuring Nate Dogg)
 "This D.J." (Warren G)
 "Do You See" (Warren G)
 1995 
 "Round & Round" (Twinz featuring Nancy Fletcher)
 "Steady Dippen" (Mista Grimm)
 1996 
 "Eastside LB" (Twinz featuring Warren G & Nancy Fletcher)
 "What's Love Got to Do with It" (Warren G featuring Adina Howard)
 1997
 "I Shot the Sheriff" (Warren G)
 "Smokin' Me Out" (Warren G featuring Ron Isley)
 1998
 "Nobody Does It Better" (Nate Dogg featuring Warren G)
 1999
 "I Want It All" (Warren G featuring Mack 10)
 2005
 "Get U Down, Part II" (Warren G featuring B-Real, Snoop Dogg, Ice Cube & Side Effect)
 "I Need a Light" (Warren G featuring Nate Dogg)
 2009
 "Ringtone" (Warren G)
 "Crush" (Warren G & Ray J)
 2011
 "This Is Dedicated To You" (Warren G featuring LaToiya Williams)
 2012
 "Leave You Alone" (Young Jeezy featuring Ne-Yo)
 "What Happened To Them Days" (E-40 featuring J Banks)
 "Party We Will Throw Now!" (Warren G featuring Nate Dogg & The Game)
 2015
 "P.D.D." (Rap Monster x Warren G)

References

External links
Warren G at Discogs

Discographies of American artists
Hip hop discographies
Production discographies